Troy Oliver is an American multi-instrumentalist, record producer and songwriter born in New Haven, Connecticut, United States. He wrote and produced "Jenny from the Block" and "I’m Real" for Jennifer Lopez, and "Differences" for Ginuwine.

References

Living people
Record producers from Connecticut
Place of birth missing (living people)
Year of birth missing (living people)